"Still Thinkin' 'bout You" is a song written by Johnny Christopher and Bobby Wood, and recorded by American country music artist Billy "Crash" Craddock. It was released January 1975 as the first single from his album Still Thinkin' 'bout You. The song peaked at number 4 on the Billboard Hot Country Singles chart. It also reached number 1 on the RPM Country Tracks chart in Canada.

Chart performance

References

1975 singles
Billy "Crash" Craddock songs
Song recordings produced by Ron Chancey
Dot Records singles
1975 songs
Songs written by Johnny Christopher
Songs written by Bobby Wood (songwriter)